Weather, Climate, and Society (WCAS) is a peer reviewed scientific journal published quarterly by the American Meteorological Society.

WCAS publishes research that encompasses economics, policy analysis, political science, history, and institutional, social, and behavioral scholarship relating to weather and climate, including climate change. Contributions must include original social science research, evidence-based analysis, and relevance to the interactions of weather and climate with society.

The governing AMS Council has eliminated page charges for papers submitted to WCAS.

See also 
 List of scientific journals in earth and atmospheric sciences

References

External links 
 Official website

American Meteorological Society academic journals
Publications established in 2009
Sociology journals
Meteorology journals
Climatology journals